Jean-Claude Annaert (22 August 1935 – 12 September 2020) was a French racing cyclist. He rode in the 1957 Tour de France, and won stage eight of the 1962 Vuelta a España. Annaert died on 12 September 2020, aged 85.

References

External links
 

1935 births
2020 deaths
French male cyclists
French Vuelta a España stage winners
Cyclists from Paris